Sooteh-Delan (meaning broken-hearted people) is a 1977 Iranian film directed and written by Ali Hatami, produced by Ali Abbasi and starring Behrouz Vosoughi. The film is the story of an old family in Tehran, in which Jamshid Mashayekhi, as the elder brother of the family, is the head of the family, and Behrouz Vosoughi, the younger brother, suffers from mental problems. This family lives. He is taken care of by his older brother.

References

External links
 

1978 films
Films directed by Ali Hatami
1978 drama films
1970s Persian-language films
Films set in Iran
Films about mental health
Iranian romantic drama films